"Ordinary Love" is a song recorded by American country music artist Shane Minor. It was released in July 1999 as the second single from the album Shane Minor. The song reached number 24 on the Billboard Hot Country Singles & Tracks chart and number 8 on the RPM Country Tracks chart in Canada. It was written by Dan Truman of Diamond Rio along with Bob DiPiero and Craig Wiseman.

Music video
The music video was directed by Steven Goldmann and premiered in July 1999. It was filmed in Montreal, Quebec, Canada.

Chart performance
"Ordinary Love" debuted at number 62 on the U.S. Billboard Hot Country Singles & Tracks chart for the week of July 24, 1999.

Year-end charts

References

1999 singles
1999 songs
Shane Minor songs
Songs written by Bob DiPiero
Songs written by Craig Wiseman
Song recordings produced by Dann Huff
Mercury Records singles
Music videos directed by Steven Goldmann